Swarajya is an Indian right-wing monthly print magazine and news portal. The publication reports favourably on the Bharatiya Janata Party.

R. Jagannathan is the current editorial director. Originally established in 1956 as a weekly under the patronage of C. Rajagopalachari, it shut down in 1980 but was relaunched in September 2014, as a daily news website; a monthly print magazine was launched in January 2015. Swarajya has misreported news on multiple occasions.

History 

Swarajya was launched as a weekly magazine in 1956 by journalist Khasa Subba Rao, under the patronage of C. Rajagopalachari, a prominent independence activist and one of the founders of the Swatantra Party.  

The magazine strongly advocated individual freedom and freedom of enterprise as against Nehru's socialist policies. Minoo Masani, Ramaswamy Venkataraman, and R. K. Laxman have contributed to the magazine. After Rajagopalachari's death in 1972, the magazine slowly began to decline and eventually closed in 1980.

Relaunch in 2014 
The magazine was relaunched as an online daily in September 2014, with Sandipan Deb as the Editorial Director; the first edition of the print magazine was launched in January 2015. Coimbatore-based Kovai Media Private Limited purchased the rights to the magazine from Chennai-based Bharathan Publishers, along with 40,000 pages from the earlier editions of the magazine. The magazine describes itself as "a big tent for liberal right of centre discourse". 

In October 2016, it acquired OpIndia; in 2018, it became an independent entity. In 2018, Swarajya launched its Hindi edition.

Reception 
The website has misreported news on multiple occasions, according to fact-checkers including Alt News and Boom. Columnists working for Swarajya have allegedly engaged in a variety of trolling over Twitter. Journalists working for Swarajya have propagated communally charged fake news via their personal accounts. Swarajya was blacklisted from Wikipedia in 2020 alongside OpIndia and Hindu nationalist website TFIpost.

References

External links 
 

1956 establishments in Madras State
Right-wing politics in India
English-language magazines published in India
Monthly magazines published in India
News magazines published in India
Magazines established in 1956
Mass media in Bangalore
Mass media in Chennai
Mass media in Coimbatore
Indian news websites